The United States Virgin Islands competed at the 1988 Summer Olympics in Seoul, South Korea. 22 competitors, 19 men and 3 women, took part in 27 events in 6 sports.

Medalists

Competitors
The following is the list of number of competitors in the Games.

Athletics

Men
Track & road events

Cycling

Road

Equestrian

Eventing

Sailing

Men

Open

Shooting

Swimming

Men's 50m Freestyle
 Hans Foerster
 Heat – 24.72 (→ did not advance, 44th place)
 Ronald Pickard
 Heat – 25.01 (→ did not advance, 47th place)

Men's 100m Freestyle
 Hans Foerster
 Heat – 54.29 (→ did not advance, 54th place)
 Ronald Pickard
 Heat – 54.72 (→ did not advance, 58th place)

Men's 200m Freestyle
 Hans Foerster
 Heat – 2:01.94 (→ did not advance, 58th place)
 Kraig Singleton
 Heat – 2:06.45 (→ did not advance, 59th place)

Men's 100m Breaststroke
 Kristan Singleton
 Heat – 1:11.68 (→ did not advance, 55th place)

Men's 200m Breaststroke
 Kristan Singleton
 Heat – 1:00.97 (→ did not advance, 44th place)
 William Cleveland
 Heat – 1:01.10 (→ did not advance, 45th place)

Men's 200m Butterfly
 William Cleveland
 Heat – 2:13.19 (→ did not advance, 39th place)
 Kristan Singleton
 Heat – 2:19.68 (→ did not advance, 40th place)

Men's 200m Individual Medley
 Kraig Singleton
 Heat – 2:16.93 (→ did not advance, 46th place)

Men's 4 × 100 m Freestyle Relay
 Hans Foerster, Kraig Singleton, Kristan Singleton, and William Cleveland
 Heat – 3:43.23 (→ did not advance, 18th place)

Men's 4 × 100 m Freestyle Relay
 Hans Foerster, Kraig Singleton, Ronald Pickard, and William Cleveland
 Heat – 8:15.51 (→ did not advance, 13th place)

Men's 4 × 100 m Medley Relay
 William Cleveland, Kraig Singleton, Kristan Singleton, and Hans Foerster
 Heat – 4:15.03 (→ did not advance, 24th place)

Women's 100m Backstroke
 Tricia Duncan
 Heat – 1:10.37 (→ did not advance, 34th place)

Women's 200m Backstroke
 Tricia Duncan
 Heat – 2:33.97 (→ did not advance, 30th place)

Demonstration sports

Taekwondo

References

External links
 Official Olympic Reports
 International Olympic Committee results database

Nations at the 1988 Summer Olympics
1988
1988 in the United States Virgin Islands